In Holocaust and genocide studies, perpetrators, victims, and bystanders is a typology for classifying the participants and observers of a genocide, first proposed by Raul Hilberg in the 1992 book Perpetrators Victims Bystanders: Jewish Catastrophe 1933–1945. Although considered a key element of scholarship on genocide, the typology has also been criticized for vagueness and leading to overgeneralization. Jan Gross proposed that helpers and beneficiaries be added to the classification. Robert Ehrenreich proposed that being a perpetrator, bystander, or victim is on a sliding scale rather than a discrete classification. The triad is also used in studying the psychology of genocide.

See also

Génocidaires

References

Further reading

Robben, Antonius C.G.M. and Alexander Laban Hinton (2023). Perpetrators: Encountering Humanity’s Dark Side. Stanford: Stanford University Press. ISBN 978-1-503-63427-5.

Genocide studies
Holocaust historiography
Holocaust terminology